Lady Tarzan is a Hindi action adventure film directed by Guna and produced by Chittoor V. Ananda Naidu. This movie was released on 16 March 1990 in the banner of Lakshmi Latha Creations. South Indian actress Silk Smitha played the title role of the movie.

Plot
A girl child was going with her father by car. Suddenly few hooligans attacked them and threw her into a dense forest. Her father was beaten badly. All thought that the girl was dead. However, she was saved by an animal family. The girl grew up with the deadly animals and forest families and become the lady Tarzan of the jungle.

Cast
 Silk Smitha
 Raza Murad
 Jamuna (actress)
 Y. G. Mahendra
 Vinod Kumar

Music

References

External links

1990 films
1990s adventure films
1990s Hindi-language films
Indian adventure films
Indian erotic films
Tarzan films
Tarzan parodies